All in! Games SA is a Polish video game publisher based in Krakow, Poland. All in! Games publishes games on all main gaming platforms PC, PS4, Xbox One, and Nintendo Switch) working on international projects.

History 
The company was formed in 2018 by Tomasz Majewski, Maciej Łaś, and Łukasz Nowak. The shareholders are Maciej Łaś, Piotr Żygadło, Łukasz Nowak, Tomasz Majewski, and January Ciszewski.

In October of 2019, Setanta signed a plan to merge with All in! Games. The merger was finalized in 2020.

On October 16, 2019 it was announced that All in! Games obtained naming rights and sponsorship of the Wisła Kraków esports section. Wisła All in! Games Kraków is the official name of the team.

All in! Games titles were presented in 2019 at a number of video game fairs: GDC, Nordic Game, Gamescom, Digital Dragons, Tokyo Game Show, PAX Seattle and Poznań Game Arena.

Games

References 

Video game publishers
Video game companies of Poland
Video game companies established in 2018
Polish companies established in 2018
Companies based in Kraków